The Voice is a 1964 novel by Gabriel Okara which was published as part of the influential African Writers Series.

Plot
The novel is set in the 1960s, in post-independence Igboland in Nigeria. After studying, Okolo returns home to seek the truth. The Chiefs exile him for fear that he might topple them down.

Style
An editor at, Encyclopædia Britannica noted that "Okara translated directly from the Ijo (Ijaw) language, imposing Ijo syntax onto English in 'order to give literal expression to African ideas and imagery. The novel creates a symbolic landscape in which the forces of traditional African culture and Western materialism contend... Okara's skilled portrayal of the inner tensions of his hero distinguished him from many other Nigerian novelists.". Okara style exhibit the true nature of the power hungry individual.

Reception
Thomas Hinde writing for Times Literary Supplement stated The Voice is a "morality tale rather than a novel" and that "its characters have the flatness of symbols"

References

Nigerian English-language novels
1964 Nigerian novels
African Writers Series
Postcolonial novels